City8 was a proposed local television channel in Birmingham that was scheduled to launch in November 2014 but went out of business before that date.

History
In 2010, Ofcom announced that local TV would be introduced in the United Kingdom.

In May 2012, a round of bidding was held for local TV licences. There were four applicants for the Birmingham area: City TV Broadcasting, Bham TV, Made in Birmingham and YourTV Birmingham. In November 2012, City TV Broadcasting Ltd won the local TV franchise for Birmingham.

On 19 February 2014, the channel's name was changed from City TV to City8 ahead of launch.

On 8 August, City8's owner BLTV went into administration, having been unable to secure sufficient funding for the channel. The licence was transferred to another operator.

Programming
City8 intended to broadcast a breakfast show, a music show, a news programme and a sports programme.

See also
Local television in the United Kingdom

References

External links

Local television channels in the United Kingdom
Proposed television channels and networks
Mass media in Birmingham, West Midlands